Dominique Blanc is a Swiss football official, businessman former player and former referee. In 2019, Blanc was appointed to be the President of the Swiss Football Association.

Personal life
On 15 March 2020, Blanc tested positive for COVID-19.

References

Living people
Association football executives
Swiss sports executives and administrators
Year of birth missing (living people)
Football people in Switzerland